Peniarth 20 is an early Welsh manuscript, written on parchment, that is part of the Peniarth collection in the National Library of Wales. It is also known as the Chronicle of the Princes because it contains an important version of the chronicle Brut y Tywysogion. Daniel Huws, the leading authority on Welsh manuscripts, has argued that the majority of Peniarth 20 dates from circa 1330. A date around the 15th century had previously been offered by J. Gwenogvryn Evans.

The Peniarth 20 manuscript contains four texts: the earliest known copy of Brut y Tywysogion, early religious prose in Y Bibl Ynghymraec, the poem Kyvoesi Myrddin a Gwenddydd (The prophecy of Myrddin and Gwenddydd) is a dialogue between Merlin and his sister Gwenddydd, and a text of bardic grammar which summarises the instructions given to pupils during their training to become professional poets. The version of Brut y Tywysogion from Peniarth 20 is also found in The Black Book of Basingwerk.

See also
 The Black Book of Basingwerk
 White Book of Hergest
 White Book of Rhydderch
 Red Book of Hergest

References

Further reading
 Daniel Huws, Llyfrau Cymraeg 1250-1400 (Llyfrgell Genedlaethol Cymru, 1992)

14th-century books
Welsh manuscripts
Mabinogion
Medieval Welsh literature
Welsh-language literature
Welsh mythology
Peniarth collection